Mohammad Aqa-ye Sofla (also Romanized as Moḩammad Āqā-ye Soflá) is a village in Baba Jik Rural District, in the Central District of Chaldoran County, West Azerbaijan Province, Iran. At the 2006 census, its population was 22, in 6 families.

References 

Populated places in Chaldoran County